Dr. Rebecca J. Keck  (1838–1904), was a 19th-century woman physician and patent medicine entrepreneur and one of the wealthiest independent businesswomen in the Midwest.

Life and career

Early years 

The oldest daughter in a large Pennsylvania Dutch pioneer farming family, Rebecca Keck (née Ilgenfritz, sometimes spelled Ilginfritz) was born in Wooster, Wayne County, Ohio in 1838.  She moved with her parents to Fairfield, Iowa at the age of thirteen, where she may have completed schooling as far as the eighth grade.  In 1857, she married John Conrad Keck, a merchant and mechanic newly arrived in Fairfield from Northampton County, Pennsylvania.

Three of Rebecca's brothers died of tuberculosis between 1857 and 1869; while she was nursing them through their illnesses, she also gave birth to six children (five girls and a boy) and began to develop a reputation among her neighbors as an herbalist.  During this time, her husband built up a substantial farm equipment and foundry business.

Medical career 

Following the national banking Panic of 1873, Mr. Keck's foundry business collapsed and the couple began to collect herbs and brew her remedies together, which Rebecca Keck started to sell door to door. Seeking a wider market, in November, 1873, she took out her first advertisement for "Keck's Catarrhochesis"  in Dubuque. Success came very quickly; within three years she was advertising her "Catarrh Cure" heavily in a number of newspapers including the Dubuque Herald, the Davenport Gazette and the Chicago Times and Chicago Tribune.

Besides selling her remedies by mail order, she practiced as an "itinerant physician," a common business model for the frontier, because sick people were scattered across long distances and lacked regular access to medical care. She would rent rooms in a local hotel or storefront for visits of two days to two weeks, and take out large advertisements in advance to advise her customers of her upcoming personal consultations. She traveled her entire circuit every two months, so that patients could see her for follow-up treatment. At its height, her practice served between 12,000 and 15,000 patients, and she would typically see 350 patients per week.

Mrs. Dr. Keck moved her family to Davenport, Iowa, on the Mississippi River, in 1875 as her business expanded. As was common for Midwestern women physicians in her day, she used both Dr & Mrs so that her married and professional status could both be understood by the public. She only treated chronic conditions and according to the testimonial letters she published in her advertising, the majority of her customers were working people and farm families who could not afford the high cost of private doctors' fees and who received her medical remedies and treatment advice by mail order.

Rebecca Keck considered herself to be a fully qualified physician by virtue of her long years of experience treating her family, neighbors and public customers. She owned a large medical library and advertised herself as an Eclectic practitioner. The Eclectic School of medicine, which grew out of the sectarian medical reform movements of the 1830s, was an active and publicly accepted school of medicine in the mid 19th century in the Midwest that competed with homeopathy and allopathic (or regular, scientific) medical approaches. Eclectic treatments combined an emphasis on botanical remedies with a willingness to use regular medical techniques in certain cases.

There is no evidence that Rebecca Keck ever graduated from an Eclectic medical school although most of them were open to women by the 1870s. She did not enroll for regular medical training at the University of Iowa's new medical school which opened for men and women in 1871. Either she could not afford the time and money required (because of her six children and her family's bankruptcy in 1873) or she did not consider a professional degree to be necessary for her practice as a physician.

Fame grows 

With the exception of Lydia Pinkham, Mrs. Dr. Keck appears to be the only woman to have earned substantial wealth on her own behalf in the lucrative but highly competitive and bruising profession of selling patent medicine in 19th century America. Like Mrs. Pinkham, Mrs. Dr. Keck began her career because of family bankruptcy caused by the Panic of 1873. Unlike Mrs. Pinkham, Rebecca Keck not only believed herself to be a practicing physician, but became the top executive of the family's business and ran it herself, with the assistance of her two oldest daughters, Belle Alexander and Charlotte Dorn, while her husband played only a peripheral role and her only son contributed even less to the operations.

It is difficult to know Mrs. Dr. Keck's exact income, but she was able to purchase her infirmary in 1879 for $12,000 in cash, and at the time of her death, her life insurance payout of $15,520 was one of the largest made in the United States for the week of May 17, 1905.

While extremely unpopular with members of the medical establishment in Iowa and Illinois, Rebecca Keck enjoyed glowing front page editorial endorsements from newspapers in the cities where she practiced. Some newspapers ran her illustrated, full-column ads on the front page under the heading, "Mrs. Dr. Keck's Column." The Decatur Review declared on November 15, 1883, "We have a marked example among us of success in medicine, in the person of Mrs. Dr. Keck, well-known in the West," while the Bloomington Pantagraph declared on August 30, 1883 that Mrs. Dr. Keck "absorbs considerable public attention and is a subject for congratulation among the women of America…a forcible illustration of the ability of women to succeed" in "avenues of professional or public life." The Quincy Whig said she was "one of our longest established and best known physicians," while the Evening Peorian referred to her "celebrity as a physician and good name as a citizen." The Peoria National Democrat declared, "her success is unprecedented…she is capable of doing the work of five ordinary women."

The regular medical establishment disagreed. The secretary of the Illinois State Board of Health, Dr. John Rauch was quoted in the Chicago Tribune as saying that Mrs. Dr. Keck was "foul and damnable in every way," and mostly male members of county medical associations were hardly less kind; Dr. James Clarke M.D. of Fairfield averred that the sale of her catarrh cures "made the doctor wealthy, even if it did not cure her patients." Regular doctors universally dismissed her as a quack, and her name was excluded from the physicians and surgeons listing in the Davenport business directories every year after 1878, although she continued to describe herself as a specialist and physician in the regular alphabetical listings and bought the entire back cover of the 1882 edition to advertise her infirmary.

Legal reform 

The state of Illinois passed its Medical Practices Act in 1877 in an effort to exert some control of the wholly unregulated medical profession in the state. This Illinois law was a landmark in health law in the United States, leading the way towards improved standards for the dismal state of medical licensing and medical education in the country at that time. The act defined requirements for a physician's license that were extremely loose by modern standards, but which were sufficient to expel thousands of untrained and unqualified physicians and quacks from the state during the first year after it was passed. Popular opposition to this measure was strong, and outraged citizens complained that a law requiring doctors to obtain a license to practice medicine was "an opening wedge for socialized medicine" in the state.

Mrs. Dr. Keck refused to stop treating her patients in Illinois and quickly emerged as one of the most formidable opponents to the state's legal reform effort. As she pushed back against the new governmental regulations, Mrs. Dr. Keck became locked in a highly publicized, adversarial relationship with the secretary of the new Illinois State Board of Health, Dr. John H. Rauch M.D., that lasted for at least a decade. When local doctors tried to block Mrs. Dr. Keck from practicing in McLean County, Illinois in early 1878, the Bloomington Daily Leader called hers the first test case of the new legislation, "the beginning of a long and tedious litigation" between the "regulars" and the "irregulars." The lasting stigma of these accusations was probably an important reason why her accomplishments faded quickly and completely from public view after her death, and her career remains little known today.

Criminal charges were brought against Mrs. Dr. Keck in at least five different counties in Illinois for practicing medicine without a license between 1878 and 1889, but she was ably defended by her lawyer W. S. McCoy and persisted in business in McLean, Logan, Champaign, Peoria and Adams counties in Illinois for twenty years. Iowa's medical legislation had even less effect on her business, and she opened Mrs. Dr. Keck's Infirmary for All Chronic Diseases in Davenport in 1879, practicing with uninterrupted financial success there and in Cedar Rapids, Dubuque and rural communities in Iowa until she retired in 1900.

Accusations of quackery 

Over the years, Mrs. Dr. Keck grew more and more boastful of her ability to cure many types of chronic diseases, including tuberculosis, an obviously impossible task in an era before the bacillus that caused the disease had even been identified.  Grateful patients wrote to her when they were cured of chronic lung infections, piles, eczema, general debility, deafness and a host of other issues, and she published their testimonial letters in her advertisements.,

Fraudulent testimonial letters were a common feature of 19th century patent medicine advertising. Nevertheless, United States Census records from 1880 show that many of these people actually existed as presented in print by Mrs. Dr. Keck. However, in over a thousand ads that survive to be studied today, less than a hundred different individuals are named, and there is no way to verify the facts presented about their illnesses, particularly the accuracy of the diagnoses, and there is no way to know for sure what percentage of her thousands of other patients did and did not get cured.

Regular allopathic medical practice during the 1870s and 1880s often involved "heroic" treatments with harsh, mineral medications containing lead, mercury (calomel) and arsenic, as well as toxic vegetable compounds containing strychnine, castor oil (derived from ricin), belladonna and other poisonous substances we would consider extremely dangerous today. Clumsy, unsanitary surgical procedures were also common, so it is not impossible that Mrs. Dr. Keck's herbal tonics and sensible nursing advice were actually better for her patients than the regular doctors' remedies in some cases.

It is unlikely that Mrs. Dr. Keck ever hurt anyone. Alert opponents in the medical profession would have been quick to pounce on any provable instance if she had ever actually harmed a patient with her treatments. While a number of outright quacks were taken to court by angry patients seeking reparations for botched treatments in Davenport during the years she practiced, no such accusation against Mrs. Dr. Keck shows up in the public record.

The only parties who sued her during her career were male doctors with M.D. credentials. In every instance, they were seeking to solidify institutional boundaries for their evolving practice of allopathic or scientific medicine by first preventing her from getting a license and second by preventing her from practicing medicine without one. No evidence that she harmed a patient was ever produced in any of these cases.

Bibliography 

 Beatty, William K. M.D. (1991) "John H. Rauch—Public Health, Parks and Politics" in The Proceedings of the Institute of Medicine of Chicago Volume 44 
 Bres, Rose Falls (1918) Maids, wives and widows: the law of the land and of the various states as it affects women. New York: E.P. Dutton & Co. 
 Clarke, James Frederic, M.D. F.A.C.S. (Dec. 1934 to Dec. 1935) "A History of Medicine in Jefferson County Iowa," The Journal of the Iowa State Medical Society (published serially)
 Ehrenreich, Barbara and Deirdre English (1973 and 2010) Witches, Midwives & Nurses The Feminist Press at the City University of New York
 Lawrence, Susan C. (2003) "Iowa Physicians: Legitimacy, Institutions, and the Practice of Medicine, Part One: Establishing a Professional Identity, 1833-1886" The Annals of Iowa 62 (Spring 2003) The State Historical Society of Iowa 
 More, Ellen (1990) Restoring the Balance: Women Physicians and the Profession of Medicine 1850-1995 Harvard University Press
 Sandvick, Clinton (2009) "Enforcing Medical Licensing in Illinois: 1877-1890" Yale Journal of Biology and Medicine June 2009; 82(2) pp. 67–74 
 Shryock, Richard H. (1960) Medicine and Society in America: 1660-1860 Cornell University Press
 Stage, Sarah (1979) Female Complaints: Lydia Pinkham and the Business of Women's Medicine W.W. Norton & Co.
 Starr, Paul (1982) The Social Transformation of American Medicine Basic Books
 Wilson, Jennie Lansley (1894) Legal Status of Women in Iowa Des Moines, Iowa: Iowa Printing Company
 Young, James Harvey (1961) The Toadstool Millionaires: A Social History of Patent Medicines in America before Federal Regulation Princeton, NJ: The Princeton University Press

References 

19th-century American women physicians
19th-century American physicians
Patent medicine businesspeople
People from Davenport, Iowa
1838 births
1904 deaths
People from Wooster, Ohio
People from Fairfield, Iowa